Naganathi is a river flowing in the Tiruvannamalai district of the Indian state of Tamil Nadu.

References

See also 
List of rivers of Tamil Nadu

Rivers of Tamil Nadu
Tiruvannamalai district
Rivers of India

ta:நாகாநதி (ஆறு)